Muhammad Syabil bin Hisham (born 20 September 2002) is a Singaporean professional footballer who plays as a Defender (association football) for the Singapore Premier League side Balestier Khalsa. He made his professional debut with Tanjong Pagar United FC back in 2020.

Club

Young Lions 
Syabil Hisham joined the Young Lions's project in 2021 and stay for 2 years.

Balestier Khalsa 
In 2023, he joined Balestier Khalsa after 2 years with Young Lions.

Career statistics

Club

Notes

References

Living people
2002 births
Singaporean footballers
Association football defenders
Tanjong Pagar United FC players
Singapore Premier League players